Buba is the largest city in southern Guinea-Bissau, lying on the Rio Grande de Buba, near the Contanhez National Park. It has a population 6,815 (2008 est).

During his presidency, former President of Guinea-Bissau Kumba Yala planned to move the capital city to Buba. Those plans have been dropped since he was deposed in a coup d'état. Construction is under way for a deepwater port that could host three 70-tonne vessels at any given time. It is being built by Angola Bauxite in order to export bauxite.

The Portuguese constructed an army camp in Buba, which, shortly after independence, was used as the headquarters for a Dutch Foreign Aid Project aimed at providing the villages of Quinara and Tombali with safe drinking water. The construction of a plywood factory through Swedish Foreign Aid in 1982 boosted the economy and growth of Buba, as it installed a steam engine which produced enough electricity to supply the whole town.

References 

Quinara Region
Populated places in Guinea-Bissau
Sectors of Guinea-Bissau